The Grant Devine Dam, formerly  Alameda Dam, is an embankment dam located near Alameda, and Oxbow, Saskatchewan, Canada. It was constructed in 1994 to control flows on the Moose Mountain Creek, and Souris River. It provides flood protection and irrigation for this area of Saskatchewan, along with protection for Minot, North Dakota. The Grant Devine Reservoir provides opportunities for recreational use such as boating and fishing. The project is owned and operated by the Saskatchewan Water Security Agency (formerly  Saskatchewan Watershed Authority).

Structure

The dam includes a low-level outlet structure for discharge of water to maintain the quality of the riparian environment downstream of the project, and for irrigation outflow.

A full-time staff of about five people supervises and operates this dam and the Rafferty Dam built at the same time.   Together the two projects provide flow control on the Souris River and flood protection for the city of Minot. Operation of the project is governed by an international treaty between Canada and the United States.

Moose Creek Regional Park 

Moose Creek Regional Park is a regional park on the east side of the reservoir, three kilometres north of the dam. The park encompasses about 3/4 of a section, which is about 480 acres. The park is three kilometres east of Alameda off of Highway 9 and six kilometres north of Oxbow off of Highway 18. The park features full-service camping, tenting, picnicking, swimming, boating, and fishing. There is also Moose Creek Golf Club, a 9-hole golf course. The third weekend in June each year, the Alameda Fishing Derby takes place on the lake.

See also 
List of protected areas of Saskatchewan
List of dams and reservoirs in Canada
Saskatchewan Water Security Agency
List of lakes of Saskatchewan
Lake Darling Dam

References

Further reading
Bill Redekop Dams of Contention: The Rafferty-Alameda Story and the Birth of Canadian Environmental Law, Heartland, Canada, 2012, 
George N. Hood Against the Flow:Rafferty Alameda and the Politics of the Environment, Fifth House Publishers, Saskatoon Saskatchewan, 1994,

External links

 Rafferty Alameda

Lakes of Saskatchewan
Dams in Saskatchewan
Dams completed in 1994